František Hochmann (2 April 1904 – 4 March 1986) was a Czechoslovak footballer. He competed in the men's tournament at the 1924 Summer Olympics. On a club level, he played for AC Sparta Prague.

References

External links
 

1904 births
1986 deaths
Czech footballers
Czechoslovak footballers
Czechoslovakia international footballers
Olympic footballers of Czechoslovakia
Footballers at the 1924 Summer Olympics
Footballers from Prague
AC Sparta Prague players
Association football goalkeepers